Cadlina sparsa, common name the dark-spot cadlina, is a species of sea slug or dorid nudibranch, a marine gastropod mollusk in the family Cadlinidae.

Description
The maximum recorded body length is 10 mm.

Ecology
Minimum recorded depth is 2 m. Maximum recorded depth is 8 m.

References

Cadlinidae
Gastropods described in 1921